A swimrun is a multiple-stage competition which involves participants running and swimming over a race course that involves multiple swim and run stages. Typically participants do not change clothing in transitions as in other multi-sports such as triathlon. All equipment used by participants has to be carried all the way to the finish line.

History
The first swimrun race was the Swedish Ö till ö (stylized as ÖtillÖ), a  course across 26 islands. In 2002, Anders Malm, the owner of Utö Värdshus (the finish line hotel of ÖtillÖ), his friend Janne Lindberg and some of his staff (the Andersson brothers) had a late night in the bar. They challenged each other – "Last team of two to Sandhamn pays for hotel, dinner and drinks". Two teams of two started the next morning with the only rule being that they had to pass the three different restaurants on the islands between the start and the finish. The last team at the restaurant had to drink and pay what the team ahead of them had ordered for them. It took them more than 24 hours and they were too tired to party on arrival. They tried again the year after with the same result. They're referred to as Original 4.

In 2006, Michael Lemmel and Mats Skott were asked if they could make a commercial race out of their crazy challenge. The first couple of years only 11 teams started and only two teams managed to finish within the time limits. They were: Petri Forsman, Ville Niemelä and Johan Hasselmark, Martin Sahlen ref). Then something happened and the teams learned that the only way to race is by not stopping, with constant movement. Unlike the original course set by the creators, Utö became the finish line while Sandhamn became the start. The race became known as ÖtillÖ (Island to island), Today the race is internationally recognized as the Swimrun World Championship for ÖtillÖ and has been ranked by CNN as one of the toughest races in the World. It was also later mentioned by one article as one of the toughest 1-day endurance races in the world, and is currently the standard when it comes to rules and style of racing.

In 2011 the style of racing picked up the name "Swimrun", given by Erika Rosenbaum, one of the ÖtillÖ Swimrun World Championship podium finishers.

In 2012 was the race with more than nine (3man/3woman/3mix) finisher teams and the years of the consolidation of the race ref.

In 2014 on August 3, the first swimrun race done in warm water Results was Aquaticrunner XTriM ITALY and it started . It is an individual swimrun race and not a standard dual-team race such as in ÖtillÖ. The biggest different between Aquaticrunner and the Nordic races are two: the Individual/Solo race (no team) and that swimming tools are not permitted (no fins, snorkel, etc.) with the exception that a pull buoy is allowed (Paddle starting from 2017). The Other races done outside of Sweden in 2014 was: Rockman Swimrun and XTERRA Swimrun (stapped in 2016) both in Norway, Engandina in Switzerland and Amphibianman in Italy (this was the first outside of Sweden done on May 10, 2014). Aquaticrunner 2014 was also the first Individual/Solo Swimrun done in the world and it was realized by Matteo Benedetti.

In 2014, the organisation World of Swimrun / Worldofswimrun (WoS) was formed (***) [needs 2014 Constitutional meeting]. World of Swimrun is a neutral, independent and global non-profit organisation: By swimrunners - for swimrunners, with a mission to bring swimrun to everybody and provide the latest swimrun news. World of swimrun also hosts the biggest data source on available and active races in the world. (***) Please indicate the link of the Constitutional meeting or something to official of WoS foundation, Facebook is not something to consider official

In 2015, the world's first Ultraswimrun, the Stockholm Archipelago Ultra Challenge (SAUC) took place, and is considered the current (2019) toughest available swimrun race challenge in the world, stretching over some 250 km. SAUC is also the official Ultraswimrun open challenge. In 2015 the swimrun started in Russia with Individual and Team forums.

In 2015, the World Swimrun Federation was founded in Switzerland Constitutional meeting (Canton Ticino Switzerland - official language: Italian). The objective of WSRF is to discipline, organize, promote, advance and spread out the sport of Swimrun throughout the wide world in Individual/solo and Team formula. The scope is to promote and develop swimrun sport in the world in accordance with the principles set out by the Olympic Charter and in protection of physical and mental health of athletes, fighting doping in all its forms. The organisation is independent and global non-profit.

In 2016, SwimRun Australia became the first SwimRun not only in Australia but also the southern hemisphere, bathing the way for the growth of SwimRun in the Asia-Pacific region . Most swimrun races are completed in teams of two. Starting from 2016, there are some individual/solo swimrun in the world: starting from Italy (Italian Swimrun series 12 race swimrun italy), now 17 race, Love Swimrun, Canarie Swimrun and Portugal Swimrun, in Individual and Team forums.

In 2017, In France, swimrun is linked to the FFTRi, as it is in Finland. Others individual/solo swimrun on 2017 was Canada Canaqua Swimrun and Uruguay Swimrun. In Africa, Torpedo SwimRun held the first swimrun race on the continent in Cape Town on January 15, 2017. The race covers 16 km of Cape Town coastline, with swims in the South Atlantic and running at the base of Table Mountain.　In Japan, Kaiyo SwimRun held the first swimrun race in Asia on May 27, 2017.

In 2018, the world's first book on swimrun was published Swimrun – The Guide to Swimrun Training & Racing, Stockholm, Sweden (2018).In 2018 Aquaticrunner was the first individual World Championship with 22 nations represented and 250 athletes qualified. The world qualified was done in Fuerteventura, Madeira, Canada, Russa, Uruguay, Belgin, and Italy. In Japan, a new swimrun race, called Marunuma Swimrun was held which contained regular and sprint distance.

The international focus has been growing in the last years, and on December 28, 2018 there are more than 500 known races in the world, in 24 countries and on 5 continents.

In 2018, Ultra Swimrun ALPS consisted in a  run,  swim D+, passing through to the alpine lakes and is the swimrun race with the maximum total elevation.
Swimrun debuted on March 30, 2019 in Brazil and became the first race in tropical countries. Búzios SwimRun changed to Hero SwimRun in honor of the effort of the athletes. The event also carried out environmental actions before the race, collecting  of garbage in partnership with the Swedish Embassy in Brazil and with the local government.

In 2019, SwimRun U.S. Series Ignite Swimrun became the first SwimRun series in the United States of America with 5 races using the individual/solo formula. Aquaticrunner was the second individual W.C. with 19 nations represented.

In 2020, with the big pandemic situation, some races were held anyway, Otillo Engadin was done, Aquaticrunner was the Italian Championship and Fuerteventura Swimrun assigned the World Cup in Half Category, but 80% of the races were canceled.

In 2021 ÖtillO, The Swimrun World Championship was done with many qualifications. Aquaticrunner was the third Solo World Championship with 20 nations represented and 240 athletes qualified in many countries (Fuerteventura, Madeira, Uruguay, Hungary, Belgim and Italy.

Swimrun characteristics
What defines a swimrun is that its always carried out outdoors and in water where the goal is to go from a starting point to a finish point through a course with at least two swim and two run sections. All the equipment that a participant starts with has to be carried all the way to the finish line, meaning swimming needs to be done with shoes. Even though swimrun urges participants to use flotation equipment, equipment larger than 100×60 cm is not allowed.
Swimming with shoes makes the kick fairly inefficient and breaststroke not so suitable. The flotation equipment keeps the legs at surface meaning a good crawl position can be maintained without kick.

Because of safety measures a swimrun competition is usually carried out by teams but there are several races where you can race individually. There are three classes to compete in; either a men's class, women's class or a mixed gender class.

Given that swimrun takes place outside in natural surroundings, there are no standards in terms of how far the total run and swim should be. There is also no rule on the ratio between the swim and run distances. There is also no set minimal or maximal distance of the individual swim or run segments. SwimRun organisers are free to select suitable area's similar to cross-country races in running.

Swimrun organisors typically mention at least the total swim and run distance of their races so participants know if the event suits them. Most organisors also provide details on the length of all individual run and swim segments for participants' further preparation. To give participants a quicker insight into a swimrun event's characteristics some organisors also provide an overview of the number of swim and run segments and then just the length of the longest run segment and longest swim segment. Any altitude covered during runs is also mentioned.

The Swimrun Book by Niklas Karlson does specify that a swimrun should be 'carrying at least two swim and run sections'. This implies a minimum of three transitions which distinguishes swimrun from otherwise similar sports like aquathlon, biathle. These only have a single swim and one or two transitions.

Another difference is that in swimrun all equipment shall be carried all the way from start to finish. While aquathlon — like triathlon — has a transition area with a spot for each participant to get their shoes and run clothes and leave a wetsuit or other swimming gear.

Distances 

The race levels vary in the world. There are no set race limits or race standards apart from having to compete in twos and as to what is constituted as a swimrun race. Currently the majority of races (2018) are spread among the following levels below (1st table).

The world standard swimrun distances are divided into 6 types, in accordance with the majority of available races including ÖtillÖ.

In Italy foremost, and few other European countries, a different distance scheme is used. 

In France on 2017, the FFTri, defined the national standard distances.

Considering that since 2018 many organizers propose both formula (team and  individual), this is  merge of the two distance table

The historical races 2006 - 2016

References

Endurance games
Multisports